"View from a Bridge" is a song by English singer Kim Wilde, released internationally as the second single from her second album, Select (1982). The song tells the story of a girl committing suicide by jumping off a bridge after finding her lover with another girl. It was a top 10 hit in several European countries and in Australia. A faster version with a dance beat was released in 2006 on Never Say Never.

Charts

Weekly charts

Year-end charts

References

1982 singles
Kim Wilde songs
European Hot 100 Singles number-one singles
1982 songs
Songs written by Marty Wilde
Songs written by Ricky Wilde
Songs about suicide
RAK Records singles